Carter Cruise is an American DJ, singer, music producer, model, and former erotic actress who advocated for the sex positive movement.

Early life
Cruise was born in Atlanta, Georgia, and raised in Cary, North Carolina. She was home schooled during her childhood and went to Cary High School. In 2009, she enrolled at East Carolina University, majoring in psychology and pre-law. While in school, she was heavily involved in Greek life, pledging a sorority as a freshman. In late 2013, she left her psychology studies at ECU to pursue a full-time career in the adult industry. Prior to becoming an adult film performer, she worked as a Hooters girl and lifeguard.

Career
Cruise began working as an erotic model in the summer of 2013. She made her porn debut in August of that year after contacting the Florida-based talent agency East Coast Talents. Her first agent advised her to market herself towards older men, but she instead marketed her brand towards both male and female college students. She moved to Los Angeles in March 2014 and signed with the agency Spiegler Girls in June. That same month, she was featured in AVN’s "fresh" issue.

Cruise is interested in making extreme movies that explore issues of female submissiveness and consent. She cites Sasha Grey as an influence due to the way she expressed her vulnerability in her films. She has appeared in several features, including "Mrs. Polito" in American Hustle XXX from Smash Pictures and as a stepsister in Cinderella XXX. She was cast as the lead in director Jacky St. James’ romance feature, Second Chances, produced by New Sensations.

In 2015, Cruise became the second performer to ever win AVN Awards for Best New Starlet and Best Actress in the same year, after Jenna Jameson in 1996. In October 2015, she signed an exclusive one-year contract with Axel Braun Productions.

Appearances
Cruise was the subject of an interview for Cosmopolitan magazine's website called "Sex Work", which profiles women who have careers in sex-related industries.

Other ventures
Cruise is pursuing a career as a DJ/producer. On January 19, 2015, Cruise released her first track, "DUNNIT", a collaboration with Styles&Complete and Crichy Crich, for Buygore Records. In an interview, Cruise stated that she is working on several songs and has also done some writing for various outlets, including sex advice blogs.

Advocacy
Cruise is also friends with fellow collegiate porn actress Belle Knox. Encouraged by her father, Cruise contacted Knox because she believed that she was "one of the few people who could really understand what she was going through." With regard to the publicity that Knox received, Cruise commented that she was "disgusted and appalled by the way civilized society tormented an 18-year-old woman for being sexual. The whole affair really demonstrated how important it is that we improve sexual education and tackle stigmas, as well as foster compassion and empathy between people."

Personal life
In a 2014 interview for the online edition of Cosmopolitan magazine, she revealed that she has always wanted to be in the entertainment industry. She went on to say that she had not originally intended to go to college but did so to continue a relationship with a man she was dating. After taking a semester off to assess and plan her future, she came up with the concept of "Carter Cruise" as a brand and as a means to accomplish her goals with regards to writing, acting, music, and fashion. Cruise stated, "How can I do all of these things in one lifetime? Porn was the first step because it gave me the capital and the connections to not only build my brand but also to lay the foundations for other creative things that I wanted to get involved in."

She stated in an interview that both of her parents know about her career choice and are supportive. Cruise, who describes her father as "the biggest feminist", said that growing up he set up meetings for her with women CEOs, writers, architects, and entrepreneurs. She also states that she was "100 percent aware of the stigma of porn when I made the decision to do it. What I'm doing is risky and I totally understand that and I understood the risk. A year ago I was sitting in class wondering what the hell I was going to do with my life and last night I got nine AVN nominations. You're in this whirlwind of experiences. I could write a book on the past year alone. I plan to do that actually."

Discography
Send Moods (2018 EP)
Bones Shake (2019 Single)

Awards and nominations

See also 

 Nina Hartley 
 Bobbi Star
 Belladonna

References

Further reading

External links

 
 
 

Actresses from Atlanta
American female adult models
American people of Welsh descent
American pornographic film actresses
East Carolina University alumni
American women DJs
Living people
Native American pornographic film actors
People from Cary, North Carolina
Pornographic film actors from Georgia (U.S. state)
Pornographic film actors from North Carolina
21st-century American women singers
Year of birth missing (living people)
21st-century American women musicians
21st-century American musicians
21st-century American singers